The 2020 Central Michigan Chippewas football team represented Central Michigan University in the 2020 NCAA Division I FBS football season. They were led by second-year head coach Jim McElwain and played their home games at Kelly/Shorts Stadium as members of the West Division of the Mid-American Conference.

Schedule
Central Michigan had games scheduled against Nebraska and Northwestern, which were canceled due to the COVID-19 pandemic.

Game summaries

Ohio

at Northern Illinois

Western Michigan

at Eastern Michigan

Ball State

at Toledo

References

Central Michigan
Central Michigan Chippewas football seasons
Central Michigan Chippewas football